This is a complete list of the 164 shorts in the Tom and Jerry series produced and released between 1940 and 2014. Of these, 162 are theatrical shorts, one is a made-for-TV short, and one is a 2-minute sketch shown as part of a telethon.

1940–58: Hanna-Barbera/MGM Cartoons 

The following 114 cartoons were directed by William Hanna and Joseph Barbera at the Metro-Goldwyn-Mayer cartoon studio in Hollywood, California. All cartoons were released to theaters by Metro-Goldwyn-Mayer. Rudolf Ising was the producer of Puss Gets the Boot; subsequent cartoons were produced by Fred Quimby through 1955. Quimby retired in 1955 and from 1955 to 1957, Hanna and Barbera produced the shorts until MGM closed the cartoon studio in 1957, and the last cartoon was released in 1958. Most of these cartoons were produced in the standard Academy ratio (1.37:1). Four cartoons were produced for both Academy Ratio and CinemaScope formats (2.55:1, later 2.35:1). Finally, 19 cartoons were produced in widescreen CinemaScope format only (though reissues have the standard Academy ratio (1.37:1) instead).

Like the other studios, MGM reissued and edited its cartoons when rereleased to theaters. Many pre-1952 cartoons were reissued with Perspecta Sound, which was introduced in 1954. MGM also reissued its cartoons before the introduction of Perspecta Sound. Because of the 1965 MGM vault fire, all original film of pre-September-1951 MGM cartoons are lost, leaving only the backup prints (usually the altered reissue prints), although some production artwork relating to the missing material has survived, like pencil sketches.

1940

1941

1942

1943

1944

1945

1946

1947 
{| class="wikitable"
|-
!style="width:2em"| #
!style="width:2em"| Prod.Num.
!style="width:12em"| Title
!style="width:7em"| Date
!Summary
! Notes
|-
| 27
| 155
| Cat Fishin'''
| February 22, 1947
| Tom goes fishing using Jerry as bait and deals with watchdog Spike.
| 
|-
| 28
| 153
| Part Time Pal| March 15, 1947
| Mammy warns Tom to keep Jerry out of the refrigerator or she'll throw him out, but Tom accidentally becomes repeatedly drunk and befriends Jerry.
| 
|-
| 29
| 165
| The Cat Concerto| April 26, 1947
| Pianist Tom performs Hungarian Rhapsody No. 2 by Franz Liszt until Jerry breaks up his act.
| Won an Oscar for Best Short Subject, Cartoon. In 1994, it was voted #42 of the 50 Greatest Cartoons of all time by members of the animation field, the only Tom & Jerry cartoon to make the list.
|-
| 30
| 157
| Dr. Jekyll and Mr. Mouse| June 14, 1947
| Tom tries to prevent Jerry from drinking his milk by poisoning it, but his plan completely backfires when the poison transforms Jerry into a monster.
| Nominated for an Oscar for Best Short Subject, Cartoon. Original titles is rarely found on a 16mm Afga-Gevaert print with only one tiny splice at the Tom and Jerry card.
|-
| 31
| 158
| Salt Water Tabby| July 12, 1947
| Tom woos Toodles on the beach.
| 
|-
| 32
| 162
| A Mouse in the House| August 30, 1947
| Tom and Butch compete against each other to catch Jerry on Mammy Two Shoes' orders, but she ends up kicking out all three animals.
| Rarely seen on Cartoon Network and Boomerang due to perceived racial abuse occurring in the end.
|-
| 33
| 163
| The Invisible Mouse| September 27, 1947
| Jerry uses "invisible ink" to turn invisible and outsmart Tom.
| 
|-
|}

 1948 

 1949 

 1950 

 1951 

 1952 

 1953 
{| class="wikitable"
|-
!style="width:2em"| #
!style="width:2em"| Prod.Num.
!style="width:12em"| Title
!style="width:7em"| Date
!Summary
! Notes
|-
| 73
| 254
| The Missing Mouse| January 10, 1953
| After Jerry is covered in white shoe polish, he scares Tom into thinking that he is an explosive white mouse that escaped from a lab.
| Only Tom and Jerry cartoon scored by Edward Plumb because Scott Bradley was on vacation.
|-
| 74
| 256
| Jerry and Jumbo| February 21, 1953
| Jerry befriends a baby elephant named Jumbo and disguises him as a large mouse to mess with Tom.
| First appearance of Jumbo and his mother.
|-
| 75
| 266
| Johann Mouse| March 21, 1953
| As the pet owned by Johann Strauss in Vienna, Tom becomes an accomplished pianist himself after his master goes away in order to lure dancing Jerry out with piano music.
| Last cartoon in the series to win an Oscar for Best Short Subject, Cartoon.
|-
| 76
| 260
| That's My Pup!| April 25, 1953
| Spike strikes an agreement with Tom for the feline to act scared whenever Tyke barks at him.
| 
|-
| 77
| 258
| Just Ducky| September 5, 1953
| After Quacker hatches, Jerry befriends him and teaches him how to swim so he can find his family, but Jerry must also protect him from Tom.
| 
|-
| 78
| 262
| | October 17, 1953
| Jerry is a scoutmaster who is taking two young mice (both resembling Nibbles) on a hiking trip.
| Rarely airs on Cartoon Network and Boomerang because of Native American stereotyping.
|-
| 79
| 264
| Life with Tom| November 21, 1953
| Jerry writes an autobiography titled Life with Tom, which Tom has mixed emotions reading.
| Compilation short; contains footage from Cat Fishin', The Little Orphan, and Kitty Foiled.
|-
|}

 1954 

 1955 

 1956 

 1957 

 1958 

 1961–62: Gene Deitch/Rembrandt Films cartoons 
The following thirteen cartoons were directed by Gene Deitch, produced by William L. Snyder, and animated at Snyder's Rembrandt Films in Prague, Czechoslovakia (now in the Czech Republic). All cartoons were released to theaters by Metro-Goldwyn-Mayer.

 1961 

 1962 

 1963–67: Chuck Jones/Sib Tower 12 cartoons 
The following 34 cartoons were produced by Chuck Jones in Hollywood, California. Earlier cartoons were produced in conjunction with Walter Bien's "Sib Tower 12 Productions" (one or the other credited on the 1963 and 1964 productions), until it was integrated into a new animation department called MGM Animation/Visual Arts. Directors (if other than Jones) or co-directors for each short are listed. All cartoons were released to theaters by Metro-Goldwyn-Mayer. Note: All the Chuck Jones MGM Tom and Jerry shorts were in Metrocolor.

All were released on DVD in 2009 as part of Tom and Jerry: The Chuck Jones Collection.

 1963 

 1964 

 1965 

 1966 

 1967 

 2001–present: Warner Bros. cartoons 
 2001: Hanna-Barbera Productions/Turner Entertainment cartoon 

 2005, 2014, 2021: Warner Bros. Animation cartoons 

 Spin-offs and other appearances 
 The Alley Cat (1941 film, MGM one-shot cartoon) with Butch and Toodles
 War Dogs (1943 film, MGM one-shot cartoon) with Spike cameo
 Anchors Aweigh (1945 film) with Tom and Jerry cameo
 Dangerous When Wet (1953 film) with Tom and Jerry cameo
 The Three Little Pups (1953 film, Droopy cartoon) with Spike cameo
 Spike and Tyke (1957 MGM cartoon series) with Spike and Tyke
 Who Framed Roger Rabbit (1988 film) with Spike cameo
 Tom and Jerry: The Movie (1992 feature film)
 Tom & Jerry (2021 feature film)
 The Tom and Jerry Show (1975 TV series, 16 episodes)
 The Tom and Jerry Comedy Show (1980 TV series, 15 episodes)
 Tom & Jerry Kids (1990 TV series, 65 episodes)
 Tom and Jerry Tales (2006 TV series, 26 episodes)
 The Tom and Jerry Show (2014 TV series, 71 episodes)
 Tom and Jerry in New York (2021 TV series)
 Tom and Jerry: The Magic Ring (2002 film)
 Tom and Jerry: Blast Off to Mars (2005 film)
 Tom and Jerry: The Fast and the Furry (2005 film)
 Tom and Jerry: Shiver Me Whiskers (2006 film)
 Tom and Jerry: A Nutcracker Tale (2007 film)
 Tom and Jerry Meet Sherlock Holmes (2010 film)
 Tom and Jerry and the Wizard of Oz (2011 film)
 Tom and Jerry: Robin Hood and His Merry Mouse (2012 film)
 Tom and Jerry's Giant Adventure (2013 film)
 Tom and Jerry: The Lost Dragon (2014 film)
 Tom and Jerry: Spy Quest (2015 film)
 Tom and Jerry: Back to Oz (2016 film)
 Tom and Jerry: Willy Wonka and the Chocolate Factory (2017 film)
 Tom and Jerry: Cowboy Up! (2022 film)
 Tom and Jerry: Snowman's Land'' (2022 film)

Notes

External links 
 Tom and Jerry episode guide: The Hanna–Barbera era (1940–1958)
 Tom and Jerry episode guide: The Gene Deitch era (1960–1962)
 Tom and Jerry episode guide: The Chuck Jones era (1963–1967)
 Tom and Jerry episode guide: Warner Bros. Animation (2000–present)

Film series introduced in 1940
Lists of animated films by character
Children's film series
 
 
Lists of American animated films